NGC 4313 is an edge-on spiral galaxy located about 50 million light-years away in the constellation Virgo. It was discovered by astronomer William Herschel on March 15, 1784. NGC 4313 is a member of the Virgo Cluster and is classified as LINER and as a Seyfert galaxy.

NGC 4313 has undergone ram-pressure stripping in the past.

Black Hole
NGC 4313 may harbor an intermediate-mass black hole with an estimated mass of 200,000 (2*10^5) solar masses.

See also
 List of NGC objects (4001–5000)

References

External links

4313
040105
Virgo (constellation)
Astronomical objects discovered in 1784
Unbarred spiral galaxies
07445
Virgo Cluster
LINER galaxies
Seyfert galaxies